Reuben Kemper (February 21, 1771 – January 29, 1827) was an American pioneer and filibuster.

Kemper and West Florida
Born in Fauquier County, Virginia, Kemper and his brothers Nathan and Samuel settled in Feliciana Parish, near Baton Rouge, Spanish West Florida, shortly after 1800. Expelled from the province by the Spanish authorities in a dispute over land titles, the Kemper brothers organized a small force in the Mississippi Territory and returned, declaring West Florida to be independent. They attempted to capture Baton Rouge in 1804, but were defeated, having failed to gain the support of local Anglo-American settlers. Most of the latter were satisfied with Spanish rule on account of Spain's liberal land grants and its protection of slavery. The following year Spanish forces captured all three brothers while they were on U.S. soil, but American forces rescued them as they were being taken down the Mississippi River.

In 1810, during the rebellion against Spanish rule by British and Anglo-American settlers (who comprised the majority of inhabitants), Reuben Kemper and Joseph White were authorized to invite the inhabitants of Mobile and Pensacola to join in the revolt. When Kemper crossed into the Mississippi Territory, U.S. forces arrested him, as they did not wish to provoke Spain into war and feared Kemper's intentions. He was more fortunate than his colleagues, who were seized by the Spanish authorities and sent as prisoners to El Morro, in Havana, Cuba.

But the rebellion spread and the Republic of West Florida declared independence from Spain. 78 days later, it was annexed by the United States.

Later years
In 1812-13, Kemper took part in the Gutiérrez–Magee Expedition into Spanish Texas, fighting to help free Mexico from Spanish rule. He also served as a colonel under Andrew Jackson at the Battle of New Orleans in January 1815.

Kemper settled down peacefully as a planter in Mississippi. He died in 1827 in Natchez, Mississippi, aged 55 or 56.

Legacy
Reuben Kemper is the namesake of Kemper County, Mississippi.

See also
Samuel Kemper, his brother.

Notes and references

David A. Bice, The Original Lone Star Republic: Scoundrels, Statesmen and Schemers of the 1810 West Florida Rebellion, Heritage Publishing Consultants, 2004.
Andrew McMichael, "The Kemper 'Rebellion': Filibustering and Resident Anglo American Loyalty in Spanish West Florida", Louisiana History, vol. 43, no. 2 (Spring 2002), p. 133-165.
Andrew McMichael, Atlantic Loyalties: Americans in Spanish West Florida, 1785-1810, University of Georgia Press, 2008.

External links
Reuben Kemper article at AllRefer.com.
Kemper references in the Florida Parishes of Louisiana

American pioneers
People from Fauquier County, Virginia
People from Natchez, Mississippi
1770 births
1826 deaths
American filibusters (military)